François Grudé (born 1552, Le Mans), lord of la Croix du Maine, was a French writer and bibliographer.  He wrote under the Latin pseudonym Grucithanius.

Life

Works
 La Croix du Maine, Antoine du Verdier, "Les Bibliotheques françoises", Paris, Saillant & Nyon, 1773, numbered by Google Books :
 1st volume La Croix du Maine, volume 1
 2nd volume La Croix du Maine, volume 2
 3rd volume Du Verdier, volume 1
 4th volume Du Verdier, volume 2
 5th volume Du Verdier, volume 3
 6th volume Errata, epitomes bibliothecae gesnerianae, etc.

Sources
" François Grudé", in Louis-Gabriel Michaud, Biographie universelle ancienne et moderne : histoire par ordre alphabétique de la vie publique et privée de tous les hommes avec la collaboration de plus de 300 savants et littérateurs français ou étrangers, 2nd edition, 1843–1865

French bibliographers
16th-century French writers
16th-century male writers
People from Le Mans
1552 births
Year of death unknown
French male non-fiction writers